Theodore Nathan Lerner (October 15, 1925 – February 12, 2023) was an American real estate developer, and managing principal owner of the Washington Nationals baseball team. He was the founder of the real estate company Lerner Enterprises, the largest private landowner in the Washington metropolitan area, which owns commercial, retail, residential, and hotel properties, as well as Chelsea Piers in New York City. In 2015, Forbes magazine named him the richest person in Maryland.

Early life and education
Lerner was raised in an Orthodox Jewish family in Northwest Washington D.C., the eldest of three children born to Mayer, a 1921 emigrant from British Mandatory Palestine (modern day Israel), and Ethel, who emigrated from Lithuania. He attended Raymond Elementary School, McFarland Junior High, and graduated from Roosevelt High School in 1944.

Lerner served with the U.S. Army as a typist during the latter part of World War II. Using the G.I. Bill, he attended George Washington University, where he received first an Associate of Arts and then an L.L.B. from the George Washington University Law School in 1949. While in law school, he sold homes on the weekends, which piqued his interest in real estate.

Career
In 1952, Lerner borrowed $250 from his wife and founded the real estate company Lerner Enterprises in Rockville, Maryland. Among the Lerner Enterprises ventures is a partnership in Chelsea Piers, a  sports and entertainment complex on the Hudson River in New York City; the Tysons II commercial development; shopping centers including White Flint and Dulles Town Center; and thousands of homes and apartments, along with numerous office buildings. Lerner also played a role in developing other shopping centers in the Washington area, including Tysons Corner Center and Wheaton Plaza.

The headquarters of Lerner Enterprises in Rockville was the first Leadership in Energy and Environmental Design (LEED) platinum certified multi-tenant commercial building in the D.C. area and has been the recipient of multiple design and environmental awards.

Washington Nationals
The Washington Nationals franchise (then known as the Montreal Expos) was formerly owned and operated by Major League Baseball from February 15, 2002, until the official transfer of ownership to Lerner on July 24, 2006. The Lerner family is the majority owner of the franchise, controlling over 90% of the shares. Lerner retired as managing principal owner in 2018, ceding the role to his son, Mark D. Lerner. Under Lerner's ownership, the Nationals won four National League East division championships and appeared in the postseason five times. Lerner won a World Series ring when the Nationals defeated the Houston Astros in the 2019 World Series.

Monumental Sports & Entertainment
The Lerner family is also a partner in Monumental Sports & Entertainment, which owns the Washington Capitals of the National Hockey League, the Washington Mystics of the Women's National Basketball Association, the Washington Wizards of the National Basketball Association, and Capital One Arena.

Philanthropy and accolades
The Annette M. and Theodore N. Lerner Family Foundation provides support to many organizations, including: Food & Friends; The Hebrew University of Jerusalem; Shady Grove Adventist Hospital; Hadley's Park; the Weizmann Institute of Science; the Scleroderma Foundation of Greater Washington; YouthAids; Junior Achievement of the Greater Washington Area; the Charles E. Smith Jewish Day School; and the Jewish Community Center of Greater Washington, among many others. Ted and his wife Annette are founding members of the United States Holocaust Memorial Museum in Washington, D.C. The American Academy of Achievement awarded Ted Lerner the Golden Plate Award of Excellence in 1990.

The campus of the Charles E. Smith Jewish Day School in Rockville is named in his and his wife's honor after a multimillion-dollar donation to the school. The lunch room in the Melvin J. Berman Hebrew Academy was donated by the Lerner Family. The family has also donated the Lerner Family Health and Wellness Center and Theodore Lerner Hall at George Washington University in Washington, D.C. along with the Lerner Center at Hebrew University in Israel. The family donated the theater at Imagination Stage in Bethesda, Maryland.

Notable achievements include:
1990 American Academy of Achievement's Golden Plate Award of Excellence
Elected to the Washington Business Hall of Fame by Junior Achievement of the National Capital Area in 2003
Elected to the Jewish Community Center of Greater Washington Sports Hall of Fame in 2007
Elected to the Washington DC Sports Hall of Fame in 2015

Personal life and death
On June 17, 1951, he married Annette M. Lerner. They had three children: Mark D. Lerner (married to Judy Lenkin Lerner), Debra Lerner Cohen (married to Edward L. Cohen) and Marla Lerner Tanenbaum (married to Robert K. Tanenbaum). Ted Lerner had nine grandchildren and 11 great-grandchildren.

His daughter, Marla Lerner Tanenbaum, is chair of The Annette M. and Theodore N. Lerner Family Foundation and chair of the Washington Nationals Philanthropies and the Washington Nationals Youth Baseball Academy. The family are the sole owners and heirs of Lerner Enterprises.

Lerner died from pneumonia at home in Chevy Chase, Maryland, on February 12, 2023, at age 97.

References

External links
Lerner Enterprises
Washington Post article – Behind a Wall of Silence, Lerner Has Built an Empire
Washington Post article – A Family That Plays Hardball
Washington Post article – A Dynasty of Closed Ranks

1925 births
2023 deaths
Businesspeople from Washington, D.C.
American billionaires
United States Army personnel of World War II
American people of Lithuanian-Jewish descent
American real estate businesspeople
Jewish American baseball people
Major League Baseball executives
Washington Nationals owners
Lawyers from Washington, D.C.
George Washington University alumni
George Washington University trustees
George Washington University Law School alumni
Jewish American sportspeople
United States Army soldiers
Deaths from pneumonia in Maryland